The Stop CSG Party (Coal Seam Gas) was a registered minor political party in Australia that ran candidates in the 2013 federal election.

The party has been involved in Glenn Druery's Minor Party Alliance.

The party was deregistered by the Australian Electoral Commission in March 2015, after failing to respond to the AEC's notice to confirm eligibility for registration.

References

External links
Stop CSG Party website

See also
List of political parties in Australia

2013 establishments in Australia
2015 disestablishments in Australia
Defunct political parties in Australia
Energy in Australia
Political parties disestablished in 2015
Political parties established in 2013
Single-issue political parties